The 2002 National Lacrosse League season is the 16th season in the NLL.  The season began on November 16, 2001 and concluded with the championship game on April 13, 2002, so, during that season, it was known as the 2001-2002 season as can be seen in the Albany Attack's 2001-2002 Central Division Championship banner.

The Toronto Rock defeated the Albany Attack 13–12 to win their third championship in four seasons. Colin Doyle was named championship game MVP for the second time.

Only one year after the season was lengthened to 14 games, 2002 saw it extended again, this time to 16 games.

Team movement
2002 was a year of expansion for the NLL, particularly north of the border. No less than four teams were added, three of them Canadian: the New Jersey Storm, Montreal Express, Vancouver Ravens, and Calgary Roughnecks all made their NLL debuts. The expansion caused the NLL to return to a divisional format for the first time since 1994. The teams were split into the Eastern, Central, and Northern divisions; the winners of each division would make the playoffs, as well as the top three ranked non-division-winners. The Eastern division consisted of Washington, Philadelphia, New York, and New Jersey, the Central division had Albany, Rochester, Montreal, Buffalo, and Columbus, while the remaining Canadian teams (Toronto, Ottawa, Vancouver, and Calgary) were in the Northern division.

Early in the morning of February 14, limousine driver Costas Christofi was found shot to death at the home of New Jersey Storm owner Jayson Williams. Williams was later arrested and charged with manslaughter. Williams was acquitted of most charges, but was to be retried for reckless manslaughter. However, the case was delayed several times. On Monday, January 11, 2010, Williams pleaded guilty to aggravated assault in the case, and was sentenced on February 23, 2010. Williams would remain owner of the Storm until the franchise folded after the 2005 season.

For the first time in league history, a team changed arenas midseason, as the Ottawa Rebel left the Corel Centre for the smaller Ottawa Civic Centre.  There were two home games left in the season at the time of the move.

Milestones
November 23, 2001: The first ever game for both the Montreal Express and Calgary Roughnecks was a record-setting affair. Montreal set an NLL record for goals by one team in a game by defeating the Roughnecks 32–17 in Calgary. The records for most goals by in a game by both teams (49) and most penalty minutes in a game by both teams (155) were also broken in this game.
January 4, 2002: Derek Malawsky of the Rochester Knighthawks sets a new NLL record with 11 assists in a 22–11 win over the Buffalo Bandits

Final standings

Regular season

Playoffs

Washington was the higher seed but surrendered the location of the game to Philadelphia for financial reasons.

All Star Game
The 2002 All-Star Game was held on April 21 at the Mohegan Sun Arena in Uncasville, Connecticut, where the North team (all of the Canadian teams plus Rochester) beat the South 14–10. The MVP was Toronto's Steve Toll, who scored three goals. At the time, this also marked Paul Gait's final professional lacrosse game, as he retired after this season. However, Gait was convinced by his brother Gary to come out of retirement during the 2005 season, and played four games for the Colorado Mammoth before retiring once again.

All-Star teams

Awards

Weekly awards
In 2002, the NLL expanded its weekly player awards from one to four. There are now awards for the best overall player, best offensive player, best defensive player, and best rookie.

Monthly awards 
Awards are also given out monthly for the best overall player and best rookie.

Statistics leaders
Bold numbers indicate new single-season records. Italics indicate tied single-season records.

See also 
 2002 in sports

Footnotes

References
2002 Archive at the Outsider's Guide to the NLL

02
National Lacrosse League